For Bosch's drawings, see Hieronymus Bosch drawings.

Paintings by Hieronymus Bosch, as well as paintings attributed to him or his school, have been compiled by various organizations. An investigation undertaken by The Bosch Research and Conservation Project of a multitude of Bosch's paintings included dendrochronological research and made an approximate dating of the paintings possible. The findings of this investigation were published in a book in 2016. The book describes the other findings of the investigation as well, such as painting technique, layer structure and pigment analyses.

Bosch's works are generally organized into three periods of his life dealing with the early works, the middle period, and the late period ( until his death). According to Stefan Fischer, thirteen of Bosch's surviving paintings were completed in the late period, with seven surviving paintings attributed to his middle period. Bosch's early period is studied in terms of his workshop activity and possibly some of his drawings. There are no surviving paintings attributed before 1485.

Examples of Bosch's work can be found in Austria, Australia, Belgium, Canada, France, Germany, Italy, Netherlands, New Zealand, Portugal, Serbia, Spain, the UK, and the US.

Triptychs

Diptychs and polyptychs

Single panels and fragments of lost altarpieces

The life of Christ

Saints

Other works

See also
 Hieronymus Bosch drawings

References

Further reading
 Matthijs Ilsink, Jos Koldeweij, Ron Spronk, Luuk Hoogstede, Robert G. Erdmann, Rik Klein Gotink, Hanneke Nap, and Daan Veldhuizen. Hieronymus Bosch: Painter and Draughtsman – Catalogue raisonné, Yale University Press, New Haven and London, 2016.
 Luuk Hoogstede, Ron Spronk, Robert G. Erdmann, Rik Klein Gotink, Matthijs Ilsink, Jos Koldeweij, Hanneke Nap, and Daan Veldhuizen, Hieronymus Bosch, Painter and Draughtsman – Technical Studies, Yale University Press, New Haven, 2016.

External links

 Hieronymus Bosch gallery at Web Gallery of Art
 The Bosch Research and Conservation Project
 Hieronymus Bosch, collection of resources and pigment analyses, ColourLex

 
Bosch